Korsakovsky District is the name of several administrative and municipal districts in Russia:
Korsakovsky District, Oryol Oblast,  an administrative and municipal district of Oryol Oblast
Korsakovsky District, Sakhalin Oblast, an administrative district of Sakhalin Oblast

See also
Korsakov (disambiguation)

References